Click analytics is a special type of web analytics that gives attention to clicks (Point-and-click) which constitute the first stage in the conversion funnel. Commonly, click analytics focuses on on-site analytics. An editor of a web site uses click analytics to determine the performance of his or her particular site, with regards to where the users of the site are clicking.

Information
Click analytics may happen in real-time or "unreal"-time, depending on the type of information sought. Typically, front-page editors on high-traffic news media sites will want to monitor their pages in real-time, to optimize the content. Editors, designers and other stakeholders may analyze clicks on a wider time frame to aid them in assessing the performance of written passages, design elements or advertisements etc.

Click data may be gathered in at least two ways. Ideally, a click is "logged" when it occurs, and this method requires some functionality that picks up relevant information when the event occurs. Alternatively, one may institute the assumption that a page view is a result of a click, and therefore log a simulated click that leads to that page view.

See also
 Click tracking
 Call to action (marketing)
 List of web analytics software

References

Clicky: Real Time Web Analytics
Estimated Website Cost Of Any Domain
Click Tracking on Your Website: All you need to know

Web analytics
Internet privacy